Omar J. Marrero Díaz is a Puerto Rican government official serving as the Secretary of State of Puerto Rico, which fulfills the role of a lieutenant governor.

Personal life
Born on December 14, 1988 in San Juan, Puerto Rico, Omar J. Marrero, earned a Bachelor of Business Administration (B.B.A.) with a double major in Accounting and Finance from the University of Dayton. A Juris Doctor Interamerican University of Puerto Rico School of Law in 2006; and a masters in law (LLM) from New York University School of Law in 2008.

Career 
Marrero's public service career includes having served as Secretary of the Puerto Rico Department of Consumer Affairs. Executive Director of the Puerto Rico Ports Authority, the Convention District Authority and the Puerto Rico Public–Private Partnerships Authority, or P3 Authority. 

Marrero was the executive director of the Puerto Rico Fiscal Agency and Financial Advisory Authority (AAFAF). In July 2021, he was appointed by Pedro Pierluisi as the Secretary of State of Puerto Rico.

He also served in the United States Army Reserve for six years.

References

External links 
 

 

1988 births
Living people
Interamerican University of Puerto Rico alumni
New Progressive Party (Puerto Rico) politicians
New York University School of Law alumni
Secretaries of State of Puerto Rico
University of Dayton alumni